Gergely Siklósi (born 4 September 1997) is a Hungarian right-handed épée fencer, 2019 individual world champion, and 2021 individual Olympic silver medalist.

Medal Record

Olympic Games

World Championship

European Championship

Grand Prix

World Cup

Personal life
Competing for Honvéd, Siklósi is a member of the sports battalion of the Hungarian Defence Forces and was commanded to take part in the Covid-19 vaccination campaign in a Budapest hospital with fellow Olympian András Rédli.

Awards
Hungarian Fencer of the Year: 2019

References

External links

1997 births
Living people
Hungarian male épée fencers
Universiade medalists in fencing
Universiade silver medalists for Hungary
World Fencing Championships medalists
Medalists at the 2017 Summer Universiade
People from Tapolca
Fencers at the 2020 Summer Olympics
Medalists at the 2020 Summer Olympics
Olympic medalists in fencing
Olympic fencers of Hungary
Olympic silver medalists for Hungary
Sportspeople from Veszprém County